Salvador María Granés (1840–1911) was a Spanish journalist and author of comic theater, including many parodies of the serious theatrical genres of the late nineteenth century.

External links
 

1840 births
1911 deaths
Spanish dramatists and playwrights
Spanish male dramatists and playwrights
Spanish journalists